Leader II is the 6th studio album by English musician Gary Glitter. It was his first album in seven years, 1984's Boys Will Be Boys being his previous album. The album includes the single "Ready to Rock".

Mark Pearson played all of the instruments, except for the saxophone. The album was recorded at the Greenhouse in London N1 and was produced by Glitter's son, Paul Gadd, Jr.

Track listing
All songs written by Gary Glitter and Mark Pearson
Side One
"Ready to Rock" 3:52
"Tonight" 4:12
"Why Do You Do It" 4:09
"Wild Woman" 3:53
"(The Only Way To) Survive" 5:09
Side Two
"Lets Go Party" 3:43
"Are You Hard Enough" 4:27
"Shake It Up" 4:03
"It's Enough" 5:40
"Am I Losing You" 4:27

Personnel
Gary Glitter – vocals
Mark Pearson – guitar, bass, keyboards, backing vocals, drums, percussion, drum programming
Simeon Jones – tenor saxophone (except tracks 3 and 7)
John Earle – tenor and baritone saxophone (tracks 3 and 7)
Lorna Barnett – backing vocals (track 6)
Paul Gadd, Jr. – producer (except track 6)
John Hudson – producer (track 6)

References

1991 albums
Gary Glitter albums